Kazanowski is a Polish language occupational surname, which means "cauldron maker" or "furnace worker", from the Slavic word kazan, meaning "kettle", "boiler" or "furnace". The name may refer to:

Adam Kazanowski (1599–1649), Polish nobleman
Aleksander Dominik Kazanowski (1605–1648), Polish nobleman
Gerald Kazanowski (born 1960), Canadian basketball player
Marcin Kazanowski (1563–1636), Polish nobleman
Marianna Kazanowska (1643–1687), Polish noblewoman
Zygmunt Kazanowski (1563–1634), Polish nobleman

See also
Kazanowski Palace, Warsaw

References

Occupational surnames
Polish-language surnames